The End Of A Beautiful Career is the first mini-album from the band Angelica, released on Fantastic Plastic Records. It includes the singles "Bring Back Her Head" and "Why Did You Let My Kitten Die?" and reached #4 in the Indie Charts. It was released on CD and limited edition 10" lollipop orange coloured vinyl with an extra track.

Track listing
 "All I Can See"  – 3:47 (Colton)
 "Bring Back Her Head"  – 4:08 (Ross)
 "Concubine Blues"  – 3:35 (Colton)
 "Sea Shanty"  – 3:38 (Ross)
 "You Fake It/You Make It"  – 3:03 (Ross)
 "Why Did You Let My Kitten Die?"  – 2:35 (Ross)
 "Fireflies"  – 4:26 (Colton)
 "A.N.G.E.L.I.C.A." - 2:00 (Angelica) (Only available on Vinyl version)

References

2000 albums
Angelica (band) albums